I'm from Arkansas is a 1944 American musical comedy film directed by Lew Landers.

Plot summary 
The town of Pitchfork, Arkansas makes national headlines when Esmeralda the sow gives birth to 18 piglets. Among the visitors to Pitchfork are a troupe of showgirls hoping to entertain the visitors and a folk music group returning to their home after their touring is through.  In addition to the artists a meat packing company sends two men to investigate what made Esmeralda give birth to so many piglets and to bring the secret back to increase meat production.

Cast 
Slim Summerville as Juniper Jenkins aka Pa
El Brendel as Oly
Iris Adrian as Doris
Bruce Bennett as Bob Hamline
Maude Eburne as Matilda Alden Jenkins aka Ma
Cliff Nazarro as Willie Childs
Al St. John as Farmer
Carolina Cotton as Abigail 'Abby' Alden
Danny Jackson as Efus Jenkins
Paul Newlan as Farmer
Harry Harvey as Stowe Packing Company Representative
Arthur Q. Bryan as Commissioner of Agriculture
John Hamilton as Harry Cashin, Vice President of Slowe Packing Company
Douglas Wood as Governor of Arkansas
Walter Baldwin as Packing Company Attorney
Flo Bert as Showgirl
The Pied Pipers as Quartet
The Sunshine Girls (including Mary Ford) as Girl Trio
Jimmy Wakely as Jimmy Wakely

Soundtrack 
The Pied Pipers – "You're the Hit of the Season"
Jimmy Wakely and The Sunshine Girls – "You Are My Sunshine" (Written by Jimmie Davis and Charles Mitchell)
Jimmy Wakely – "Don't Turn Me Down Little Darlin'"
Jimmy Wakely and The Sunshine Girls – "Whistlin' (Walkin') Down the Lane with You" (Written by Jimmy Wakely and Oliver Drake)
Carolina Cotton – "I Love to Yodel" (Written by Carolina Cotton), "Yodel Mountain"
The Pied Pipers – "Stay Away from My Heart" (Written by Jimmy Wakely)
The Milo Twins – "Pass the Biscuits, Mirandy"
The Pied Pipers – "If You Can't Go Right, Don't Go Wrong"
The Milo Twins – "Pitchfork Polka"

External links 

1944 films
1944 musical comedy films
1944 romantic comedy films
American black-and-white films
American musical comedy films
American romantic comedy films
American romantic musical films
Films directed by Lew Landers
Films set in Arkansas
Producers Releasing Corporation films
1940s romantic musical films
1940s English-language films
1940s American films